I Was Kaiser Bill's Batman with Pat Boone Whistling Plus Nine Vocal Performances is a studio album by Pat Boone, released in 1967 on Dot Records.

Billboard picked the album for its "Spotlight" section.

Track listing

References 

1967 albums
Pat Boone albums
Dot Records albums